John Dennis Birch (born 18 June 1955) is an English former first-class cricketer active 1973–1988 who played for Nottinghamshire. Born  in Nottingham, he made his first-class debut as a teenager batting in the middle order. Originally considered an all-rounder because of his medium-pace change bowling, his bowling faded away as he matured into a consistent, but never prolific, batsman and fine fielder.

References

English cricketers
Nottinghamshire cricketers
Cricketers from Nottingham
1955 births
Living people